Peter Ölvecký (born 11 October 1985) is a Slovak professional ice hockey forward. He played 32 games in the National Hockey League with the Minnesota Wild and Nashville Predators from 2008 to 2010. The rest of his career, which lasted from 2003 to 2019, was mainly spent in the Slovak Extraliga. Internationally Ölvecký played for the Slovakian national team at several tournaments, including the 2014 and 2018 Winter Olympics.

Playing career
Ölvecký was drafted by the Minnesota Wild at the 2004 NHL Entry Draft, 78th overall. He was called up by the Wild from their American Hockey League (AHL) affiliate, the Houston Aeros, on 28 January 2009 and made his NHL debut on 30 January 2009, where he wore the number 28, against the Edmonton Oilers.

On 16 July 2009, he signed a one-year, two-way contract with the Nashville Predators.

On 10 March 2010, Ölvecký was loaned to the Manitoba Moose of the American Hockey League (AHL), the top AHL affiliate of the Vancouver Canucks, by the Milwaukee Admirals, Nashville's prospect team. In return, the Admirals received Moose veteran Marty Murray, on loan.

Ölvecký spent the fall of 2010 in HC Dukla Trenčín in Slovakia's Slovak Extraliga, where he scored 26 points (9 goals, 17 assists). He spent the 2011 part of the 2010–11 season with KalPa of the SM-liiga. He then signed with the Kontinental Hockey League (KHL) team Lev Poprad for the 2011–12 season, but he left the team after only six games. In January 2012, he signed a try-out contract lasting until 29 January with Växjö Lakers Hockey of the Swedish Elitserien (SEL).

Career statistics

Regular season and playoffs

International

References

External links

1985 births
Living people
HC Slovan Bratislava players
Houston Aeros (1994–2013) players
Manitoba Moose players
Minnesota Wild draft picks
Minnesota Wild players
Nashville Predators players
People from Nové Zámky
Sportspeople from the Nitra Region
Piráti Chomutov players
Slovak ice hockey left wingers
Växjö Lakers players
HC Vítkovice players
Olympic ice hockey players of Slovakia
Ice hockey players at the 2014 Winter Olympics
Ice hockey players at the 2018 Winter Olympics
Slovak expatriate ice hockey players in the United States
Slovak expatriate ice hockey players in the Czech Republic
Slovak expatriate ice hockey players in Canada
Slovak expatriate ice hockey players in Finland
Slovak expatriate ice hockey players in Sweden